Kappa Chamaeleonitis, Latinized from κ Chamaeleonitis, is a single star in the southern constellation of Chamaeleon. It is visible to the naked eye as a dim, orange-hued star with an apparent visual magnitude of 5.024. The distance to this object is approximately 490 light-years, based on the star's parallax. It is drifting closer with a radial velocity of -2 km/s.

This is an aging K-type giant star with a stellar classification of K4III, having exhausted the supply of hydrogen at its core then cooled and expanded to its current size of 46 times the Sun's radius. It is a candidate periodic microvariable, with its brightness fluctuating by 0.005 magnitude at the rate of 0.25664 cycles per day. The star is 1.4 times as massive as the Sun and is radiating 486 times the Sun's luminosity from its enlarged photosphere at an effective temperature of 3,990 K.

References

K-type giants
Chamaeleon (constellation)
Chamaeleontis, Kappa
Durchmusterung objects
104902
058905
4605